Wendie Thérèse Renard (born 20 July 1990) is a French professional footballer who plays as a centre-back and captains both Division 1 Féminine club Lyon and the France national team.

Renard is one of the most decorated players in modern women's club football. She has won a record 14 French league titles and eight European Cups. In 2019, the New York Times described her as an "institution" at Lyon, the most successful club in European women's football.

Early life
Renard was born in Martinique, a French island in the Lesser Antilles. She is the youngest of four daughters. Her father died of lung cancer when she was eight years old. Prior to moving to the mainland, Renard played for Essor-Préchotain on her home island.

When she was 15, Renard flew to mainland France for a trial at Clairefontaine but was not accepted into the national training program. She subsequently took the train to Lyon and, after a more successful trial, landed a spot with Olympique Lyonnais. She left Martinique to permanently live in Lyon at the age of sixteen.

Club career
Renard joined Lyon in 2006 and, since the 2007–08 season, has been a regular within the starting eleven winning fourteen consecutive league titles from 2006 to 2020, as well numerous Challenge de France trophies. In 2010, Renard featured in the final match of the UEFA Women's Champions League and, in the 2010–11 edition, helped Lyon win the competition. She scored the opening goal in a 2–0 win over Turbine Potsdam in the final.

On 26 August 2020, she scored the winning goal in a 1–0 win against Paris Saint-Germain in the 2019–20 UEFA Women's Champions League semi-finals, to eventually win the competition for the seventh time in her career.

International career
Renard is a former women's youth international having played at under-19 and under-20 level. She made her debut for the France women's national team at the 2011 Cyprus Cup in a match against Switzerland. Renard has since represented France in two FIFA Women's World Cups and two Olympics, and was the team captain from September 2013. She was stripped of the captaincy after the Euro 2017 tournament and was ultimately succeeded by Amandine Henry. Renard regained the captaincy in September 2021.

At the 2019 World Cup on home soil, Renard scored three goals in the group stage: a brace against South Korea and a penalty against Nigeria. She also scored an own goal against Norway. Renard scored a consolation goal in France's 2–1 quarter-final defeat to the United States. The 6 foot 2 inch-tall defender was the tallest player at that edition of the World Cup.

On 24 February 2023, Renard announced she would not play at the World Cup later that year to "preserve her mental health". According to a report in French multimedia outlet RMC Sport, Renard has decided not play for the national team as long as coach Corinne Diacre is in charge. After Diacre was sacked in early March 2023, Renard said she was open to a return to the team if selected.

Style of play
Renard is physically strong, has good pace and technique, and she is capable of scoring powerful headers.

Career statistics

Club

International

International goals

Honours

Lyon
 Division 1 Féminine: 2006–07, 2007–08, 2008–09, 2009–10, 2010–11, 2011–12, 2012–13, 2013–14, 2014–15, 2015–16, 2016–17, 2017–18, 2018–19, 2019–20, 2021–22
 Coupe de France: 2007–08, 2011–12, 2012–13, 2013–14, 2014–15, 2015–16, 2016–17, 2018–19, 2019–20
 UEFA Women's Champions League: 2010–11, 2011–12, 2015–16, 2016–17, 2017–18, 2018–19, 2019–20, 2021–22
Trophée des Championnes: 2019, 2022

France
Cyprus Cup: 2012, 2014
SheBelieves Cup: 2017

Individual
 UEFA Women's Championship All-Star Team: 2013
 FIFA Women's World Cup All Star Team: 2015
 FIFA Women's World Cup Dream Team: 2015
 FIFPro: FIFA FIFPro World XI 2015, 2016, 2017, 2019, 2020, 2021, 2022
 IFFHS Women's World Team: 2017, 2018, 2019, 2020, 2021, 2022
 UEFA Champions League Defender of the Season: 2019–20
 IFFHS World's Woman Team of the Decade 2011–2020
 IFFHS UEFA Woman Team of the Decade 2011–2020

Orders
Knight of the National Order of Merit: 2022

See also
 List of women's footballers with 100 or more international caps

References

External links

 Club profile 
 
 
 
 
 StatsFootoFeminin profile 

1990 births
Living people
People from Schœlcher
French women's footballers
Martiniquais women's footballers
French people of Martiniquais descent
Black French sportspeople
Women's association football central defenders
France women's youth international footballers
France women's international footballers
Olympic footballers of France
2011 FIFA Women's World Cup players
Footballers at the 2012 Summer Olympics
2015 FIFA Women's World Cup players
Footballers at the 2016 Summer Olympics
2019 FIFA Women's World Cup players
FIFA Century Club
Division 1 Féminine players
Olympique Lyonnais Féminin players
UEFA Women's Euro 2022 players
UEFA Women's Euro 2017 players